Green Flag is a motoring assistance company in the UK.

Green Flag may also refer to:
 Green (vexillology)
 Green flag (flags that are green) 
 Green Flag Award, a mark of conservation effort in the UK
 "The Green Flag", an 1893 short story by Sir Arthur Conan Doyle